Wayne John Gill (born 28 November 1975) is an English former footballer and current physio for Fulham FC.

Career
Gill began his career with Blackburn Rovers making 3 first team appearances and was included in the 1995 Champions League Squad before spending time on loan at Dundee United and Blackpool. He had marked success at Blackpool scoring seven goals in 12 games but was unable to save the Seasiders from relegation. A move to Tranmere Rovers in July 2000 saw Gill make 16 appearances but the following season he moved to Oldham, where he would spend the next two years. In 2003-04, he moved to Scarborough, before a final playing spell with Droylsden. Gill retired from football aged 28, mainly due to an ongoing ankle injury

He is a graduate from the University of Salford with a first class honours Physiotherapy degree, which he completed in 2008. In 2016, he completed a master's degree in Sports Physiotherapy from Bath University. He is currently working as a physiotherapist at Fulham Football Club.

References

External links 

1975 births
Living people
English footballers
Blackburn Rovers F.C. players
Dundee United F.C. players
Blackpool F.C. players
Tranmere Rovers F.C. players
Oldham Athletic A.F.C. players
Scarborough F.C. players
Droylsden F.C. players
Association football physiotherapists
Sportspeople from Chorley
Alumni of the University of Salford
Scottish Football League players
Association football midfielders
Fulham F.C. non-playing staff